The Archdeacon of Cambridge is a senior ecclesiastical officer in the Diocese of Ely. The archdeacon is responsible for some clergy discipline and pastoral care in the Archdeaconry of Cambridge.

The archdeaconry has existed, as the Archdeaconry of Ely, since (at the latest) the early 12th century (before the creation of Ely diocese in 1109, the archdeaconry was in Lincoln diocese), but was renamed to Cambridge in July 2006.

List of archdeacons
All called Archdeacon of Ely unless otherwise noted.

High Medieval
bef. 1106–1110 (d.): Nicholas (Archdeacon of Cambridge, Huntingdon and Hertford in Lincoln diocese; also called archdeacon of Lincoln)
1110–bef. 1152 (d. or dep.): William Brito
bef. 1151– (d.): William of Lavington (also called Archdeacon of Cambridge)
–1189 (res.): Richard FitzNeal (also Dean of Lincoln from 1184)
bef. 1190–aft. 1202: Richard Barre
–aft. 1215 (res.): Stephen Ridel
aft. 1215–6 November 1219 (d.): Adam de Tilneia
–aft. 1233: Giles
bef. 1238–aft. 1248: Robert of Leicester
bef. 1249–1266 (res.): Nicholas of Ely
bef. 1267–aft. 1267: John de Balsham
bef. 1272–March 1289 (res.): Ralph Walpole
bef. 1291–aft. 1291 (sur.): John de Oseville
bef. 1292–aft. 1292: Ralph de Foderingeye
bef. 1302–aft. 1302: Adam

Late Medieval
bef. 1306–aft. 1306: Ralph de Fodringhey (again)
bef. 1313–September 1326 (d.): William Cardinal de Testa(Cardinal-priest of San Ciriaco alle Terme Diocleziane)
bef. 1329–bef. 1335 (res.): Gilbert de Bruer
18 October–bef. November 1335: Richard de Bentworth
aft. November 1335 – 1344 (res.): John de Ufford
1344–20 December 1356 (d.): Gaillard Cardinal de la Motte (Pope's man;Cardinal-deacon of St Lucia in Silice) 
27 October 1344 – 1348 (res.): Stephen de Ketelbergh (Bishop's man)
1351: Bernard de Caulason (Royal grant)
4 February 1357–bef. 1358 (d.): James de Beaufort (Royal grant)
18 April 1357–?: Nicholas Cardinal Roselli de Tarragona (Papal grant;Cardinal-priest of St Sixtus)
27 April 1363 – 29 October 1369 (d.): Androynus Cardinal de la Roche(Cardinal-priest of St Marcellus)
28 October 1373 – 4 March 1380 (exch.): Edward Burnell
4 March 1380–bef. 1387 (d.): John Crischirch
20–28 May 1387 (exch.): Thomas de Pattesele
28 May 1387 – 1388 (res.): Thomas Dalby
14 September 1388 – 29 August 1394 (exch.): Thomas Ferriby
29 August 1394 – 23 February 1397 (exch.): Richard Clifford
23 February–October 1397 (exch.): Adam Mottrum 
October 1397–aft. 1409: John Welbourne
bef. 1410–1412 (d.): John Metford
bef. 1418– (d.): Richard Wetheryngesete

15 March 1445–bef. 1467 (d.): John Stokes
5 February 1467–bef. 1477 (d.): Richard Bole
30 September 1477–bef. 1480: Richard Robinson
bef. 1480–17 August 1496: Thomas Morton
18 August 1496 – 9 November 1527 (res.): Thomas Alcock
9 November 1527–bef. 1534 (d.): Nicholas Hawkins
bef. May 1534 – 1540 (res.): Thomas Thirlby
24 December 1540–September 1553 (deprived): Richard Cox

Early modern
25 October 1553 – 1556 (res.): Henry Cole
bef. 1557–bef. 1559 (deprived): John Boxall
1560 (res.): John Warner
29 February 1560–bef. 1568 (d.): Robert Wisdom
21 October 1568 – 26 May 1592 (d.): John Parker
5 June 1592–aft. 1594: John Palmer
17 June 1600–bef. 1616 (d.): Robert Tinley
16 March 1617–bef. 1646: Daniel Wigmore
4 February 1647–bef. 1652 (d.): Edmund Mapletoft
2 July 1660 – 29 March 1663 (d.): Bernard Hale
8 April 1663–bef. 1679 (d.): Thomas Wren
8 November 1679 – 22 January 1681 (res.): Barnabas Oley
22 January 1681 – 9 June 1701 (d.): William Saywell
12 June 1701 – 14 July 1742 (d.): Richard Bentley
16 September 1742 – 18 October 1751 (d.): Robert Eyton
20 December 1751 – 14 September 1779 (d.): Charles Plumptre
18 October 1779 – 4 July 1816 (d.): Richard Watson (also Bishop of Llandaff from 1782)
23 September 1816 – 2 November 1858 (d.): Henry Browne

Late modern
1859–18 August 1859 (d.): Charles Hardwick
1865–1907 (ret.): William Emery
1907–10 June 1919 (d.): William Cunningham
1919–21 November 1941 (d.): Horace Price, Assistant Bishop
1942–20 June 1947 (d.): William MacKennal
1947–1961 (ret.): Herbert Kirkpatrick
1962–1970 (res.): Michael Carey
1970–1981 (ret.): John Long (afterwards archdeacon emeritus)
1981–1993 (ret.): David Walser (afterwards archdeacon emeritus)
1993–2004 (ret.): Jeffrey Watson (afterwards archdeacon emeritus)
2004–14 March 2014 (ret.): John Beer
In 2005, Beer's title was changed to Archdeacon of Cambridge.
16 September 2014–present: Alex Hughes

References

Sources

Lists of Anglicans